Delacău (Dalakeu, Delakeu) is a commune in the Grigoriopol sub-district of Transnistria, Moldova. It is composed of two villages, Crasnaia Gorca (Красна Горка, Красная Горка) and Delacău. It is currently under the administration of the breakaway government of the Transnistrian Moldovan Republic.

Notable people
 

Konstantin Pogreban (born 1987), former professional footballer

References

Communes of Transnistria